Spirit Phone is the seventh album by Lemon Demon, a musical project created by American musician Neil Cicierega. Released in 2016, the album was Lemon Demon's first full-length album in eight years. The album was released digitally through Bandcamp on February 29, 2016, and other streaming services the following day. On July 10, 2018, independent label Needlejuice Records announced vinyl, CD and cassette releases, which shipped on October 21, 2018.

All tracks were written, performed and recorded by Neil Cicierega. The album's cover art was created by Cicierega's wife, the Massachusetts comic book artist Ming Doyle. The song "Sweet Bod" features a guitar solo by Dave Kitsberg of Time Lord rock group Time Crash. The album received generally positive reception and was largely successful, with the track "Touch-Tone Telephone" currently Lemon Demon's most played song on Spotify, with over 54 million streams, and surpassing "The Ultimate Showdown of Ultimate Destiny".

History 
Shortly after the release of Lemon Demon's 2008 album View-Monster, Cicierega began work on the next Lemon Demon album which would be released eight years later as Spirit Phone. 

In July 2009, "Eighth Wonder", a song about the cryptid Gef, was made available as an mp3 download on lemondemon.com, followed by a music video for the song posted to his Youtube channel in November of that year. This release was nearly identical to the version heard on Spirit Phone. A demo produced during this time titled "Ivanushka" would later be adapted into Spirit Phone track "Touch-Tone Telephone". The original version was eventually released to Neil Cicierega's Patreon in January 2018.

Between 2010 and 2016, Cicierega would tease more early versions of tracks that would eventually appear on Spirit Phone, released online as demos or performed live. In April 2012, an early version of "Reaganomics" was uploaded to Neil's second channel, along with a video accompaniment intended for live shows, edited from clips of Ronald Reagan in his final film role The Killers. Reaganomics would be performed live at the anime convention Youmacon 2012, along with early versions of "As Your Father I Expressly Forbid It", "Ancient Aliens", and "Cabinet Man".

In July 2012, Cicierega posted two unused opening themes for the animated television series Gravity Falls to his Tumblr blog, elements of which would become Spirit Phone bonus tracks "Gravitron", and "Moon's Request" respectively (the latter being a remix of the original opening theme Cicierega made for Gravity Falls that removes any mentions of the show). In October 2014, "When He Died" was released on Patreon.

The album was released digitally on February 29, 2016, followed by a remastered physical release on vinyl, CD, and cassette in October 2018 by Needlejuice Records, followed by 8-track and minidisc releases in 2019 and 2020.

Reception 
Mashable included "Touch-Tone Telephone" and "Eighth Wonder" on their official 2019 Halloween playlist, calling "Touch-Tone Telephone" one of many "real gems". Cultured Vultures called the horror-themed Spirit Phone "one of the wildest pop albums of the year". The album was the best-selling album on Bandcamp for the first week of its release.

Cabinet Man, a song about a man who turns himself into a half-human arcade machine, would later inspire the indie game Neon Nemesis, featured at the 2019 Alt.Ctrl.GDC Exhibition. The game is played by up to four racers, against a fifth player, the "nemesis" who controls their character out of sight of the others, from inside the game cabinet itself.

Track listing 
All tracks are written, performed and recorded by Neil Cicierega, except where noted.

Bonus tracks 
The album also contains 13 bonus tracks; consisting of demos, cut songs, and additional music. The following is the track listing of the deluxe bonus CD. On digital services these tracks are arranged in alphabetical order and all subtitled "(Bonus Track)"; and "Sweet Bod (Demo)" is simply named "Sweet Bod".

The vinyl and cassette releases contain the bonus tracks "Crisis Actors", "Redesign Your Logo", "Pizza Heroes", "You're at the Party" and "Angry People". The bonus track "Kubrick and the Beast" was added to the vinyl and cassette releases starting with 2022 pressings. All physical releases also include a download card for the full album, along with album commentary by Cicierega, except for the CD release which already has the full album and commentary.

Personnel 
Musicians
Neil Cicierega – vocals, instruments, programming, engineering, production
Dave Kitsberg – electric guitar (track 6)
Artwork
Ming Doyle – cover artwork, picture disc artwork
Production
 Mark Kramer – remastering (Needlejuice pressings 2018-2021)
 Angel Marcloid – remastering (Needlejuice pressings beginning in 2022)

References

External links 
 Official website

2016 albums
Neil Cicierega albums
Synth-pop albums by American artists